Clifford Smith (born December 29th, 1974), better known as Mr. Vegas, is a Jamaican dancehall musician.

Biography
Clifford Smith was born in Kingston in 1974. The moniker "Mr. Vegas" was given to Smith by his schoolyard football-mates, who thought that he kicked the ball like a Las Vegas dancer. In his early years as a singjay, Vegas sang covers of Jamaican hits at local parties and shows, and acquired a reputation as a troublemaker for his lyrics. During a scuffle over stolen master tapes, Vegas was hit in the face with a crowbar and had his jaw wired shut for six weeks. Vegas claims that, after hearing Beenie Man's hit "Who Am I", he immediately demanded that his still-healing jaw be unwired, changing his speech pattern but allowing him to practice toasting.

He found fame in 1998 with hits such as "Yu Sure", "Jack It Up", and "Latest News". For his first major hit, Vegas versioned the wildly popular "Playground" Riddim (Sean Paul's "Infiltrate" among others) to create "Nike Air", which became a huge hit in Jamaica. The next single, "Heads High", with an anti-oral sex lyric, followed its success in Jamaica with a chart run in the UK and a No. 69 peak on the U.S. R&B chart, and Vegas became increasingly in demand as a guest artist by acts such as Sean Paul.

In 1998, his debut album, Heads High was released, which hit No. 5 on the US Reggae chart. Vegas won a MOBO for Best Reggae Artist for the Heads High album as well. 2000's single "Hot Gal Today" was a minor hit on the US R&B chart, peaking at No. 66. In 2001, he issued Damn Right, featuring guest appearances from Shaggy and Big Yard; this album went to No. 2 on the US Reggae chart. 2004 saw the release of the Pull Up LP on Delicious Vinyl Records, and the title track scraped the bottom of the Hot 100, peaking at No. 98 (as well as No. 68 on the R&B chart). In 2006, he did a soca collaboration with Machel Montano, "Dance with You" on Montano's B.O.D.Y. album. His latest, 2007's Hot It Up, featured the Jamaican hits "Hot Wuk", "Taxi Fare" and "Tek Weh Yuhself". In 2008, Mr. Vegas also recorded "On the Floor" with Trinidadian artist Destra Garcia on her album, Soca or Die.

Retirement
In September 2008, Smith announced that he was retiring from the music industry, citing unhappiness with his work and a desire to spend more time with his children and be "closer to God Almighty". Although he had been suffering from ill-health for some time, he denied that this was a factor in his retirement. However, in 2009 and 2010 he made new songs such as "Man a Gallis", "Can't Stop Now" (Major Lazer), "Mix Up Peggy", "Wanna See You Move" (DJ GQ) and "Fi Get Rich".

Return to music
Recording throughout 2011 and in early 2012 for his newly formed label imprint MV Music, Mr. Vegas released his new album, Sweet Jamaica on 29 May 2012.

To celebrate Jamaica's 50th Anniversary, Mr. Vegas took to the studio to produce an all-star remix, The Voices of Sweet Jamaica with a cast of reggae greats including Shaggy, U-Roy, Barrington Levy, Marcia Griffiths and more. Proceeds of the recording went to benefit the children of Mustard Seed Communities in Kingston, Jamaica.

In 2012, Mr. Vegas received a MOBO Award nomination in the UK. Sweet Jamaica was named by Google Music as one of the 'Top 50 albums of 2012', endorsed by Complex Magazine in the 'Top 100 Albums of 2012' as well as appearing on the 'Best of 2012' in the reggae section of iTunes. The album debuted at number 7 on the Billboard Reggae Albums chart.

Vegas received multiple awards at the 32nd IRAWMA celebration on 4 May 2013 when "Sweet Jamaica" was selected for Song of the Year, and "Bruk it Down" for Video of the Year.

Reggae Euphoria was released in September 2014. He featured on a remixed version of Beyoncé's "Standing on the Sun", which was included on the 2014 'Platinum Edition' of her self-titled album.

An album of cover versions, Lovers Rock and Soul, was released in October 2015.

In 2019, Mr. Vegas released the track "Wobble Ma Head" with Indian artists Akade & PABLO.

Discography
Heads High (1998), Greensleeves
Reggae Max (1999), Jet Star
Mr. Vegas (1999), VP
Damn Right (2001), Greensleeves
Pull Up (2004), Delicious Vinyl
Hot It Up (2007), Universal
The Hits (2008), Greensleeves
Sweet Jamaica (2012), MV Music
Reggae Euphoria (2014), MV Music
Lovers Rock and Soul (2015), MV Music
This Is Dancehall (2016), VPAL Music
ISM (2018), MV Music
"Wobble Ma Head" (with Akade & PABLO) (2019)

References

External links
Official website
Mr. Vegas at Myspace
[ Mr. Vegas] at AllMusic

1974 births
Living people
Musicians from Kingston, Jamaica
Jamaican reggae musicians
Jamaican dancehall musicians
Delicious Vinyl artists
VP Records artists
Greensleeves Records artists